Good Fortune may refer to:

Good Fortune (78 Saab album)
Good Fortune (Brotherhood of Man album)
Good Fortune (song), a song by PJ Harvey
Good fortune